The 2024 United States Senate election in Nebraska will be held on November 5, 2024, to elect a member of the United States Senate to represent the state of Nebraska. Incumbent Republican Senator Deb Fischer was first elected in 2012 to fill the seat of retiring Ben Nelson, and was re-elected in 2018. Fischer will seek a third term despite a previous pledge to retire.

Republican primary

Candidates

Declared
 Deb Fischer, incumbent U.S. Senator (2013–present)

Democratic primary

Candidates

Declared

General election

Predictions

Notes

References

External links
Official campaign websites
Deb Fischer (R) for Senate

2024
Nebraska
United States Senate